Buddhist Maha Vihara (also called as the Brickfields Buddhist Temple) is a Sri Lankan temple situated in Brickfields of Kuala Lumpur in Malaysia. The temple became a focal point for the annual Wesak festival within the city suburb.

History 
After the establishment of the first Sinhalese temple called Bodhi Langka Ram Vihar in Perak of British Malaya in 1889, a second temple was proposed by the Sinhalese community in 1894 to be construct in an area within the administration capital of Kuala Lumpur where large numbers of their community civil servants are living and working. Facing financial difficulties to acquire a land, the community then appeal to the British government through English engineer C.E. Spooner. The British government responded to the request but said any land in the administration capital intended for public service can only be granted towards an organisation. After a thorough discussion among the Sinhalese community, they agreed to form an organisation called the Sāsana Abhiwurdhi Wardhana Society which also responsible to resolve social issues among their community with a foundation stone for the temple shrine room being laid down on 25 August 1894.

Through the inaugural meeting among the community, they agreed that the appointment of the temple abbot should be from British Ceylon and the temple administration would be under the Sinhalese. A living quarters was then built to house the first monk Patthalagedera Dhammananda Thera and his student Godagama Sobhita Thera from British Ceylon who later arrived in 1895 which also marked the foundation of the temple in the same year; despite the structure was only completed in the first decade of the 20th century, as the control from one primary race became a constraint on the temple development until the policy was rebuked in the later years. Although the temple management is solely controlled by the Sinhalese, a donor list published by the temple management showed that local Chinese Buddhist also donated a huge sum of money during the temple construction; the largest sum of donation coming from Chinese Kapitan of Kuala Lumpur, Yeap Quang Seng. Since 1920, Chinese devotees also became increasingly significant in the temple.

Features 
Since the foundation of the organisation, the Sāsana Abhiwurdhi Wardhana Society is responsible for the administration of the temple and all activities conducted on site. Religious activities are annually organised by the society. With the establishment of the modern country of the Federation of Malaysia, the society was registered on 3 April 1962. Following the amendments of the country constitution in 1996, the society name was changed to the Buddhist Missionary Society Malaysia with the temple become its headquarters.

References

News articles

External links 
 
 

Religious buildings and structures completed in 1895
Buddhist temples in Malaysia
Buildings and structures in Kuala Lumpur
Religious buildings and structures in Kuala Lumpur
Tourist attractions in Kuala Lumpur
Overseas Sri Lankan Buddhist temples
Sri Lankan Theravada Buddhist temples and monasteries
19th-century Buddhist temples